Atys convexa is a species of small tropical sea snail, a bubble snail, a marine opisthobranch gastropod mollusk in the family Haminoeidae, the haminoea bubble snails.

Distribution
This marine species occurs off the Andaman Islands.

Description
The length of the shell of this species attains 3.25 mm, its diameter 2 mm.

(Original description) The umbilicate shell is tumid, ovate and constricted at the ends. It hasa pale lemon colour, with two irregular narrow greenish bands especially noticeable on the ventral surface. It is smooth, polished except at the ends where it is spirally grooved. The apex is closed. The aperture is narrow above but broadening below. The columella descends obliquely, curved outwards and produced. The peristome is simple, rising high above the vertex.

References

Haminoeidae
Gastropods described in 1908